Mardi or Mardi and a Voyage Thither is an 1849 novel by American author Herman Melville.

Mardi, the French word for Tuesday, may also refer to:
 Mardi (people), an Iranian tribe
 Mardi, Medak district, Andhra Pradesh, India
 Mardi, New South Wales, a suburb in Australia
 Märdi, Valga County, an Estonian village
 Märdi, Võru County, an Estonian village
 Malaysian Agricultural Research and Development Institute
 Mars Descent Imager, an instrument aboard the Curiosity Mars Rover
Mardi (given name)

See also 
 Mardi Gras (disambiguation)
 
 Mahdi (disambiguation)
 Mardis, a surname